Natural disasters in Colombia are the result of several different natural hazards that affect the country according to its particular geographic and geologic features. Human vulnerability, exacerbated by the lack of planning or lack of appropriate emergency management, and the fragility of the economy and infrastructure contribute to a high rate of financial, structural, and human losses.

Some of the natural hazards present in Colombia are:

 Earthquakes
 Floods
 Landslides
 Volcanoes

Geologic

Colombia is part of the Pacific Ring of Fire and Andean Volcanic Belt due to the collision of the South American Plate and the Nazca Plate.  This produces an increased risk of earthquakes and volcanic eruptions.  Some natural disasters of this type are:
The 1875 Cúcuta earthquake
The 8.2  Tumaco earthquake shook Colombia and Ecuador with a maximum Mercalli intensity of IX (Violent), killing 300–600, and generating a large tsunami.
The 1982 Popayán earthquake
The 1985 eruption of Nevado del Ruiz volcano and subsequent Armero tragedy
The 1994 Páez River earthquake
The 1999 Armenia earthquake that affected heavily the city of Armenia, Colombia in the Quindío department.

Hydrologic

Rainfall is heaviest in the Pacific lowlands and in parts of eastern Colombia, where rain is almost a daily occurrence and rain forests predominate. Precipitation exceeds 760 centimeters annually in most of the Pacific lowlands, making this one of the wettest regions in the world. The highest average annual precipitation in the world is estimated to be in Lloro, Colombia, with 13,299 mm (523.9 inches). In eastern Colombia, it decreases from 635 centimeters in portions of the Andean piedmont to 254 centimeters eastward. Extensive areas of the Caribbean interior are permanently flooded, more because of poor drainage than because of the moderately heavy precipitation during the rainy season.
The Caribbean Region of Colombia, valleys of Magdalena river and Cauca river and the eastern savannahs are prone to floods during the two main monsoon seasons (April and November).  The opposite phenomenon of drought is also frequent. January through March and July through September are the dry seasons, when abnormally dry periods cause shortage in the water supply to crops and urban centers.

Climatic

The presence of coastal regions both in the Atlantic and the Pacific oceans increases the risk of hurricanes and tropical storms. Waves in the trade winds in the Atlantic Ocean—areas of converging winds that move along the same track as the prevailing wind—create instabilities in the atmosphere that may lead to the formation of hurricanes.  Some of the events of this type that have affected the country are:
Tropical Storm Bret (1993)
Hurricane Cesar–Douglas
Hurricane Joan–Miriam

Health and disease

Some of the main public health issues in Colombia are: malnutrition, pregnancy-related deaths, neonatal deaths, acute respiratory disease-related deaths in children under 5 years, diarrhea-related deaths in children under 5 years, lack of vaccinations, tropical diseases such as malaria, dengue fever, hemorrhagic dengue fever, yellow fever, Chagas disease and leishmaniasis,  poly-parasitism, snakebites and violence related causes of mortality.

References

Natural disasters in Colombia
Colombia